National Tertiary Route 406, or just Route 406 (or ) is a National Road Route of Costa Rica, located in the San José, Cartago provinces.

Description
In San José province the route covers Desamparados canton (San Cristóbal district).

In Cartago province the route covers Cartago canton (Corralillo district), El Guarco canton (San Isidro district).

References

Highways in Costa Rica